Bokchito is a town in Bryan County, Oklahoma, United States. The population was 632 at the 2010 census, an increase of 12.1 percent over the figure of 564 recorded in 2000. In the Choctaw language, "bok" means river, and "chito" means big or large, literally translating into "big creek".

History
A post office was established at Bokchito, Indian Territory on August 11, 1894.  It was named for a local waterway, Bok Chito, which in the Choctaw language means "Big Creek."  Bokchito, Indian Territory was platted and incorporated by the federal government as a town within the Choctaw Nation on April 27, 1901. In 1901, the population was estimated at 200.

At the time of its founding Bokchito was located in Blue County, a part of the Moshulatubbee District of the Choctaw Nation.

Dennis Rodman lived in Bokchito when he was in college.

Geography
Bokchito is located at  (34.018357, -96.141633).

The town is at the intersection of U.S. Route 70 and Oklahoma State Highway 22.

Demographics

As of the census of 2000, there were 564 people, 248 households, and 150 families residing in the town. The racial makeup of the town was 78.19% White, 13.65% Native American, 0.35% Asian, 0.35% from other races, and 7.45% from two or more races. Hispanic or Latino of any race were 1.77% of the population.

There were 248 households, out of which 27.0% had children under the age of 18 living with them, 46.0% were married couples living together, 10.5% had a female householder with no husband present, and 39.5% were non-families. 36.3% of all households were made up of individuals, and 19.8% had someone living alone who was 65 years of age or older. The average household size was 2.27 and the average family size was 2.97.

In the town, the population was spread out, with 23.4% under the age of 18, 10.5% from 18 to 24, 22.2% from 25 to 44, 25.7% from 45 to 64, and 18.3% who were 65 years of age or older. The median age was 39 years. For every 100 females, there were 80.8 males. For every 100 females age 18 and over, there were 81.5 males.

The median income for a household in the town was $21,923, and the median income for a family was $26,528. Males had a median income of $24,911 versus $20,000 for females. The per capita income for the town was $12,579. About 20.8% of families and 24.6% of the population were below the poverty line, including 34.5% of those under age 18 and 22.6% of those age 65 or over.

Economy
The economy of the area around Bokchito is based on agriculture and the production of beef and dairy cattle. Important crops have included cotton, corn, peanuts, oats, hay, and cucumbers.

Education
The towns of Bokchito and Blue consolidated their separate school districts to form the Rock Creek District. The elementary school is located in Blue, and the high school is in Bokchito.

References

External links
 Encyclopedia of Oklahoma History and Culture - Bokchito

Towns in Bryan County, Oklahoma
Towns in Oklahoma